The surname Krag may refer to:

Astrid Krag Danish politician
Christian Emil Krag-Juel-Vind-Frijs (1817 - 1896) Danish politician and nobleman
Claus Krag Norwegian professor of history
Dorothea Krag (1675 -1754) Danish noblewoman
Erik Krag, (1902 - 1987) Norwegian writer
Ernst Krag,  Waffen SS soldier
Frederik Krag (1655 - 1628) Danish ambassador
Hans Krag (disambiguation)
Jens Otto Krag, Danish politician
Lul Krag (1878 -1956) Norwegian painter
Nils Krag (1863 - 1926) Norwegian industrialist and inventor
Ole Herman Johannes Krag, (1837 - 1916) Norwegian firearms designer
Peter Rasmus Krag (1825 - 1891) Norwegian army engineer and politician
Rasmus Krag (1680 - 1755) Danish admiral 
Rasmus Krag (1763 - 1838) Danish military officer and engineer 
Sophia Magdalena Krag Juel Vind (1734–1810) Danish noblewoman and landowner
Thomas Krag, (1868 - 1913) Norwegian writer 
Vilhelm Krag (1871 -1933) Norwegian poet